The women's 100 metres hurdles at the 2018 IAAF World U20 Championships will be held at Ratina Stadium on 13, 14 and 15 July.

Records

Results

Heats
Qualification: First 3 of each heat (Q) and the 6 fastest times (q) qualified for the semifinals.

Wind:Heat 1: -1.3 m/s, Heat 2: -1.1 m/s, Heat 3: -0.9 m/s, Heat 4: -0.7 m/s, Heat 5: -0.3 m/s, Heat 6: -1.1 m/s

Semifinals
Qualification: First 2 of each heat (Q) and the 2 fastest times (q) qualified for the final.

Wind:Heat 1: -1.1 m/s, Heat 2: +0.9 m/s, Heat 3: +0.5 m/s

Final

Wind: -1.0 m/s

References

100 metres hurdles
Sprint hurdles at the World Athletics U20 Championships